Rocky Top is a summit in the U.S. state of Georgia.

Rocky Top was so named on account of its appearance.

References

Mountains of Union County, Georgia
Mountains of Georgia (U.S. state)